Mount Hancox  is a prominent mountain,  high, about  southeast of Mount Burton, rising above the north margin of Malta Plateau in the Victory Mountains of Victoria Land, Antarctica. It was named by the Mariner Glacier geology party of the New Zealand Geological Survey Antarctic Expedition, 1966–67, for G.T. Hancox, senior geologist with the party in this area.

References

Mountains of Victoria Land
Borchgrevink Coast